Milanówek railway station is a railway station in Milanówek, Poland.  The station is served by Koleje Mazowieckie, who run trains from Skierniewice to Warszawa Wschodnia.

References
Station article at kolej.one.pl

Railway stations in Poland opened in 1906
Grodzisk Mazowiecki County
Railway stations served by Koleje Mazowieckie
Railway stations in the Russian Empire opened in 1906
Railway stations in Masovian Voivodeship